CIBO-FM is a community radio station that operates on 100.5 FM in Senneterre, Quebec, Canada.

The station was launched in 1979 and is currently owned by Radio Communautaire MF de Senneterre Inc.

The station is a member of the Association des radiodiffuseurs communautaires du Québec.

External links
cibofm.wix.com/radio - CIBO-FM
 

IBO
IBO
IBO
Radio stations established in 1979
1979 establishments in Quebec